

 

Bellevue Heights is a suburb in the City of Mitcham local government area. It was originally the rural property of "Windsor Farm" and later "Sturtbrae" when owned by the family of W. G. Mills, and was named after Bellevue in Sydney by the developer Murray Hill.

The southern part of the suburb includes the northern part of the Sturt Gorge Recreation Park.

Bellevue Heights is in the Adelaide foothills. Residents usually have great views of either the city or the Sturt Gorge from their house.

History
Bellevue Heights Post Office opened on 1 September 1960 and closed in 1984.

Amenities
 Bellevue Heights Primary School
 Nursing Homes
 Sturt Gorge Recreation Park
 Manson Oval Sporting Facility
 Bellevue Heights Tennis Club

Governance
Bellevue Heights is located within the federal division of Boothby, the state electoral district of Davenport and the local government area of City of Mitcham.

References

Suburbs of Adelaide